Krugloye is a rural locality (a selo) in Vasilyevsky Selsoviet of Belogorsky District, Amur Oblast, Russia. The population was 69 as of 2018. There are 6 streets.

Geography 
Krugloye is located on the left bank of the Tom River, 30 km east of Belogorsk (the district's administrative centre) by road. Pavlovka is the nearest rural locality.

References 

Rural localities in Belogorsky District